Novi fosili is a Croatian pop band, one of the most popular music acts in the former Yugoslavia.

The group was formed in Zagreb in 1969. Their first successes came in 1976 when the composer Rajko Dujmić joined the band. That same year, Novi Fosili played at the Split Festival, where their song "Diridonda" soon became a hit throughout the country. Their next several albums sold millions of copies and delivered many hits that are still aired on radios in Croatia today. The first female singer was Đurđica Barlović, in 1983 replaced by Sanja Doležal. The group's male vocalists were Vladimir Kočiš Zec and Rajko Dujmić.

Hits include: "Za dobra stara vremena" ("For good old times"), "Milena", "Sanjaj me" ("Dream of me"), and others. The band represented Yugoslavia at the 1987 Eurovision Song Contest. With their song "Ja sam za ples" ("I wanna dance") they finished fourth.

After the breakup of the Yugoslavia, the group was disbanded, then gathered again, but without Doležal and Zec. It was disbanded again in 2001. Members of the most memorable lineup gathered again in 2005 for some revival concerts. In 2014, scandals arose surrounding Dujmićs long time drug use, causing him to be expelled from the group. The remaining members still hold small revival concerts.

Albums 

 Novi fosili - 1974
 Da te ne volim - 1978
 Nedovršene priče - 1980
 Budi uvijek blizu - 1981
 Hitovi sa singl ploča - 1981
 Za djecu i odrasle - 1982
 Volim te od 9 do 2 i drugi veliki hitovi - 1983
Poslije Svega - 1983
 Tvoje i moje godine - 1985
 Za dobra stara vremena - 1986
 Dijete sreće - 1987
 Poziv na ples - 1987
 Nebeske kočije - 1988
 Obriši suze, generacijo - 1989
 Djeca ljubavi - 1990
Druge Godine - 1995 
 Bijele suze padaju na grad - 1997
 Ljubav koja nema kraj - 1998
 Jesen - 1999
 Za dobra stara vremena (kompilacija) (together with Srebrna krila) - 2001
 Za dobra stara vremena (kompilacija) - 2005

Sources
 Novi fosili 

Yugoslav musical groups
Eurovision Song Contest entrants for Yugoslavia
Eurovision Song Contest entrants of 1987
Croatian pop music groups
Yugoslav rock music groups
Musical groups established in 1969